Harold Chapman (28 February 1922 – 20 February 2007) was a New Zealand cricketer. He played in five first-class matches for Wellington from 1943 to 1945.

See also
 List of Wellington representative cricketers

References

External links
 

1922 births
2007 deaths
New Zealand cricketers
Wellington cricketers
Sportspeople from County Tyrone